was an athletic stadium in Tokyo, Japan.

It hosted the 1922 Emperor's Cup and final game between Nagoya Shukyu-Dan and Hiroshima Koto-Shihan was played there on November 26, 1922.

Defunct sports venues in Japan
Defunct football venues in Japan